Altai City is the capital of the Govi-Altai province in western Mongolia. As of 2008, its population is 15,800.

Transportation 
The Altai Airport (LTI/ZMAT) has one runway and is served by regular flights to Arvaikheer and Ulan Bator.

Climate
Altai City has a typical Mongolian cold semi-arid climate (Köppen BSk) with subarctic (Dfc) influences, although the climate is so dry as to qualify as semi-arid despite the annual mean being sufficient for sporadic permafrost. The climate experiences long, very dry and very cold winters with short, mild summers when the majority of the scant precipitation occurs.

References 

Govi-Altai Province
Aimag centers
Populated places in Mongolia
Districts of Govi-Altai Province